The 2008 Rink hockey World Club Championship was the (second edition) of the Rink hockey World Club Championship and took place in Reus, Spain from September 22 to 28, 2008.

Format
16 teams from 10 different countries participated. The teams were divided into 4 groups of four teams each. The top two teams of each group advanced to the semifinals. The teams that didn't advance to the final stage played the classification knockout rounds.

Teams participating
Africa:

 Juventude de Viana
 Petro de Luanda

Europe:

 ERG Iserlohn
 Liceo La Coruña
 FC Barcelona
 Reus Deportiu
 HC Quévert
 ASH Valdagno
 Bassano Hockey 54
 Oliveirense
 O.C. Barcelos
 RHC Wimmis

North America:
 Decatur HC

South America:

 Centro Valenciano
 Concepción PC
 SC Recife

Draw

Group stage
All times Central European Time (UTC+1)

Group A

Group B

Group C

Group D

Final phase

Classification matches

15-16th place

13-14th place

11-12th place

9-10th place

7-8th place

5-6th place

Quarter finals

Semi finals

Bronze medal game

Final

Final table

External links
 2006 World Club Championship Official Site

2008 in roller hockey
Rink hockey World Club Championship
2008 in Spanish sport
International roller hockey competitions hosted by Spain